Kevin Grant may refer to:

Kevin Grant (soccer),  a Canadian former international soccer player
Kevin Grant (historian), an American academic historian specialising in modern Britain and Ireland, European imperialism, and international humanitarianism